Linha de Cintura, originally called Linha de Circumvalação de Lisboa, is a railway line in Lisbon, Portugal. The half circle route was opened in 1888 and connects all radial lines with stations in Lisbon: Cascais, Sul, Sintra/Oeste, and Norte. There are two railway triangles, one in Sete Rios, and another in Xabregas. It crosses all four Lisbon Metro lines, and connects to three of those at four stations.

See also 
 List of railway lines in Portugal
 List of Portuguese locomotives and railcars
 History of rail transport in Portugal

References

Sources

 

Cin
Iberian gauge railways
Railway lines opened in 1888